Lapponia is a book written by Johannes Schefferus (1621 - 1679) in Latin covering a very comprehensive history of Northern Scandinavia topology, environment and Sami living condition, dwelling-places, clothing, gender roles, hunting, child raising, shamanism and pagan religion. It was published in late 1673 and closely followed by English, German, French and Dutch translations. Adapted and abridged versions followed, where only the original chapters on shamanism and religion were preserved, the others being replaced by tales of magic, sorcery, drums and heathenism.

The book uses "Lap" mainly to notice that Samis are still pagan and it is concluded that Lap is a word introduced by the Danish historian Saxo Grammaticus (ca. 1150–1220) to distinguish Sami peoples living near the ocean (coast-fenni) and in the woodland (lapp-fenni).

It was aimed to meet rumors, or as the councillor Magnus De La Gardie saw it, degrading propaganda, from particular German pamphlets claiming the Swedes had used "Sami magic" on European battlefields.

The book was not fully translated into Swedish (as Lappland, Acta Lapponica 8, Uppsala 1956) until 1956. Its references are, however, based on "clergy correspondence", that is, reports made by priests.

A smaller part of the geographical region described in the book is today named Lappland (or Laponia.)

See also
Sápmi (area)
Olaus Sirma, who acted as one of Schefferus' informants.

External links 

 Johannes Schefferus (1621 - 1679) in the web exhibit «The Northern Lights Route» Tromsø University Library, 1999

1673 books
Sápmi
Sámi history
Swedish books